Aseroe coccinea is a species of stinkhorn fungus in the genus Aseroe. First reported in Japan in 1989, it was not formally validated as a species until 2007, the delay related to a publication error. The top of the receptacle is covered with dark olive-brown spore-slime, or gleba. A. coccinea can be distinguished from the more common species A. rubra by differences in the color of the receptacle, and in the structure of the arms. The edibility of the fungus has not been reported.

Taxonomy
The fungus was first described provisionally (denoted by ad interim) as Aseroe coccinea by the Japanese mycologists Yoshimi and Tsuguo Hongo in a 1989 publication with a Japanese description, based on a specimen collected on September 29, 1985, in Utsunomiya, Tochigi Prefecture, Japan. The name, however, was not published validly (nomen invalidum), according to Article 36.1 of the International Code of Botanical Nomenclature, which requires that "in order to be validly published, a name of a new taxon (algal and all fossil taxa excepted) must ... be accompanied by a Latin description or diagnosis or by a reference to a previously and effectively published Latin description or diagnosis". Taiga Kasuya reexamined the type specimen and validated the species in a 2007 Mycoscience publication. The holotype specimen is kept at the National Museum of Nature and Science in Tokyo.

The specific epithet coccinea is derived from the Latin word coccineus, and means "bright red". The mushroom's Japanese name is Aka-hitode-take (アカヒトデタケ).

Description
On the base of the egg is a white strand of mycelium. The exoperidium (the outer tissue layer) is white to cream-colored with a fibrous surface. The inner layer is membranous, with a hyaline (translucent) endoperidium (inner tissue layer). The slimy spore-bearing mass, the gleba, is olive-brown to greenish-black, with a slightly fetid odor. When the mushroom is mature, it covers the upper surface of a disc on the top of the receptacle. The stipe is pale pink near the top, white to cream at the base, spongy in texture, and hollow. The top of the receptacle is flattened to form a disc that bears 7–9, narrow, tapering "arms".

The thick-walled spores are ellipsoid to cylindrical, and measure 4–5 by 2–2.5 μm. They are hyaline (translucent), have a smooth surface, and are sometimes truncated at the base. The peridium of the "egg" is divided into two distinct layers of tissue. The outer is up to 250–400 μm thick, and made of filamentous, interwoven hyphae measuring 2.5–5 μm in diameter. These hyphae are thick-walled, septate, and hyaline. Also present in this outer layer are thick-walled pseudoparenchymatous cells (angular, randomly arranged, and tightly packed) that are 7–50 μm thick, spherical or nearly so, and yellowish-brown to pale brown. The inner tissue layer of the peridium is 100–250 μm thick and made of elongated filamentous hyphae that are 2–5 μm in diameter. These thick-walled hyphae are arranged in a roughly parallel fashion, septate, and hyaline. The receptacle consists of thick-walled, roughly spherical pseudoparenchymatous cells 5–15.5 μm thick, that contain intracellular pigment.

Similar species
A. coccinea closely resembles A. arachnoidea, but may be distinguished from the latter by its bright red arms, and its larger spores (4–5 by 2.5–3 μm in A. coccinea compared with 2.5–3.5 by 1.5 μm in A. arachnoidea). A. arachnoidea is known from Asia and West Africa. A. rubra is a relatively common pantropical species, and differs from A. coccinea in its reddish receptacle (compared with pink to cream-colored in A. coccinea) and bifurcating arms that are typically multichambered.

Habitat and distribution
Although Kasuya did not explicitly define the mode of nutrition for A. coccinea, most Phallaceae species are suspected to be saprobic—decomposers of wood and plant organic matter. The fruit bodies of A. coccinea, known only from temperate regions of Japan (Tochigi Prefecture), grow solitarily or in groups on rice husks, straw, or dung. They are found from summer to autumn.

References

External links
Image Text in Japanese

Phallales
Fungi of Japan
Fungi described in 2007